The 1992 United States presidential election in Washington took place on 3 November 1992, as part of the 1992 United States presidential election. Voters chose 11 representatives, or electors to the Electoral College, who voted for president and vice president.

Washington was won by Governor Bill Clinton (D-Arkansas) with 43.41% of the popular vote over incumbent President George H. W. Bush (R–Texas) with 31.97%. Businessman Ross Perot (I-Texas) finished in third, with 23.68% of the popular vote. Clinton ultimately won the national vote, defeating incumbent President Bush. , this was the last election in which Okanogan County voted for a Democratic Presidential nominee. It was also the first occasion since Franklin D. Roosevelt’s 1936 landslide that Whitman County had supported a Democratic presidential candidate, as well as the first time in the history of Washington state that  King County voted more Democratic than every other county in the state in a presidential election, a trend that would continue for many decades to come.

Results

Results by county

See also
 United States presidential elections in Washington (state)
 Presidency of Bill Clinton

Notes

References

Washington
1992
1992 Washington (state) elections